Mevania quadricolor is a moth of the subfamily Arctiinae. It was described by Francis Walker in 1854. It is found in Ecuador and Venezuela.

References

 

Euchromiina
Moths described in 1854